Elk Point may refer to:

 Elk Point, South Dakota
 Elk Point, Alberta